Pathibara (also known as Pathibara Chuli, Pyramid Peak, and Sphinx) is a mountain peak located on the border of Nepal and North Sikkim, India.

Location 

Along the northern flank of Pathibara, the Western Langpo Glacier flows towards the west.

Climbing history 

On 24–26 April 1993, an Indo-Japanese expedition made the first ascent of Pathibara. The team consisted of Hiroshi Iwazaki, Nobuhiro Shingo, Yoshio Ogata, Jot Singh Bhundari, Sunder Singh Martolia, Lopsang Sherpa and Purba Lepcha.

Slovenians Boris Lorencic and Miha Valic were the first to climb Pathibara from the Nepalese side in October 2007.

References 

Mountains of Nepal